The National Imagery Transmission Format Standard (NITFS) is a U.S. Department of Defense (DoD) and Federal Intelligence Community (IC) suite of standards for the exchange, storage, and transmission of digital-imagery products and image-related products. 

DoD policy is that other image formats can be used internally within a single system; however, NITFS is the default format for interchange between systems. NITFS provides a package containing information about the image, the image itself, and optional overlay graphics. (i.e. a "package" containing an image(s), subimages, symbols, labels, and text as well as other information related to the image(s)) NITFS supports the dissemination of secondary digital imagery from overhead collection platforms. 

Guidance on applying the suite of standards composing NITFS can be found in MIL-HDBK-1300A, National Imagery Transmission Format Standard (NITFS), 12 October 1994. The NITFS allows for Support Data Extensions (SDEs), which are a collection of data fields that provide space within the NITFS file structure for adding functionality. Documented and controlled separately from the NITFS suite of standards, SDEs extend NITF functionality with minimal impact on the underlying standard document. SDEs may be incorporated into an NITF file while maintaining backward compatibility because the identifier and byte count mechanisms allow applications developed prior to the addition of newly defined data to skip over extension fields they are not designed to interpret. These SDEs are described in the Compendium of Controlled Extensions (CE). This standard is mandated in the DoD for imagery product dissemination.

NITF has been implemented and fielded since the early 1990s. Its content evolved over the years to embrace new technology in support of emerging operational requirements. NITF has adopted the ISO/IEC 15444-1 standard for imagery compression, JPEG 2000. Commercial implementations of the standard are largely driven by marketability to the DoD and IC.

A follow-on update to the standard, Mil-Std-2500C, has been released. Following this update to 2500B, future documentation will be done using ISO/IEC documents and processes based on ISO/IEC 12087-5, Basic Image Interchange Format, in lieu of military standards.

The following documents define the standard:
 MIL-STD-2500C(1) — National Imagery Transmission Format (Version 2.1) for the National Imagery Transmission Format Standard, 1 May 2006, Superseding MIL-STD-2500B/CN2
 MIL-STD-2500B(2) — National Imagery Transmission Format (Version 2.1) for the National Imagery Transmission Format Standard, 22 August 1997 with Notice 1, 2 October 1998, and Notice 2, 1 March 2001.
 NITF Extensions 2.1 — The Compendium of Controlled Extensions (CE) for the National Imagery Transmission Format (NITF), Version 2.1, 16 November 2000.
 MIL-STD-188-199(1)— Vector Quantization Decompression for the National Imagery Transmission Format Standard, 27 June 1994 with Notice 1, 27 June 1996.

Do not confuse this with the British National Transfer Format.

References

External links 
 NITFS Technical Board Public Page
 Reference Library for NITFS Users
 NITRO

United States Department of Defense information technology
Raster graphics file formats
Graphics standards